Karaoy (Qaraoi) is a village in Ile District of Almaty Region, in south-eastern Kazakhstan.

References

Populated places in Almaty Region